A bottle rocket is a very small skyrocket.

Bottle rocket or bottle rockets may also refer to:

 Bottle Rocket, a 1996 film
Bottle Rocket (soundtrack), the soundtrack to that film
 Bottle Rocket (album), a Guardian album
 Bottle rocket (model), a type of model rocket using water as its reaction mass
 "Bottle Rocket" (single), a 2005 single by The Go! Team
 The Bottle Rockets, an alt-country music group
 Bottlerocket Entertainment, a video game developer
 Bottle Rocket (company), a now defunct developer of Web-based casual games and advergames from 1996 until 2000
 Water rockets